The first season of RuPaul's Drag Race All Stars premiered on the Logo network on October 22, 2012. Contestants from the original RuPaul's Drag Race show returned to compete again. Cast members were announced on August 6.

This season features 12 returning contestants representing all four seasons. It aired six one-hour episodes. Contestants were judged on their "charisma, uniqueness, nerve and talent" and, since they competed in teams of two, also "synergy". The winner received a supply of MAC cosmetics, a "one of a kind trip" and $100,000. The theme song playing during the runway every episode is "Sexy Drag Queen" (dootdoot 'doot-swift' Remix) and the song playing during the credits is "Responsitrannity" (Matt Pop's Edit), the latter of which is originally from RuPaul's album Glamazon.

The first episode introduced several changes to the rules for the All Stars competition. Queens competed in teams of two, determined by the contestants themselves. Both members of the losing team would be eliminated each week. The bottom two teams chose one member to "lip synch for their lives". The non-lip synching teammates had the option during the first minute of the performance to declare a "she-mergency", hit a panic button and "tag in" to complete the performance. Mimi Imfurst and Pandora Boxx teamed up to form "Team Mandora", Tammie Brown and Nina Flowers teamed up to form "Team Brown Flowers", Latrice Royale and Manila Luzon teamed up to form "Team Latrilla", Yara Sofia and Alexis Mateo teamed up to form "Team Yaralexis", Raven and Jujubee teamed up to form "Team Rujubee" and Shannel and eventual winner Chad Michaels teamed up to form "Team Shad". RuPaul dedicated the first episode in memory of Sahara Davenport, a former competitor in season 2 of RuPaul's Drag Race who died due to heart failure.

The winner of the first season of RuPaul's Drag Race All Stars was Chad Michaels, with Raven being the runner-up.

Contestants

Ages, names, and cities stated are at time of filming.

Notes:

Contestant progress

Lip syncs
Legend:

Judges
Listed in chronological order:
Rachel Hunter, actress and reality television show host
Ross Mathews, comedian and television personality
Busy Philipps, actress
Vicki Lawrence, actress, comedian, and singer
Rachel Dratch, actress and comedian
Janice Dickinson, model, photographer, author, and talent agent
Mary Wilson, singer, author, and actress
Rosie Perez, actress, dancer, choreographer, director, and community activist
Wendi McLendon-Covey, actress, writer, producer and comedian
Elvira, Mistress of the Dark, actress and television hostess
Beth Ditto, singer, songwriter and model
Cheri Oteri, actress and comedian

Episodes

References

External links
Official website
 RuPaul's Drag Race All-Stars on the Internet Movie Database

RuPaul's Drag Race All Stars seasons
2012 American television seasons